The Federal Front (FF) was a proposed Indian political alliance of regional parties for the 2019 general election proposed by Telangana Chief Minister K. Chandrashekar Rao.

History 
A united "Federal Front" of regional parties was proposed in March 2018 by West Bengal Chief Minister Mamata Banerjee and Telangana Chief Minister K. Chandrashekhar Rao. Talks and discussions among the parties concluded in the United India rally, held on 19 January 2019, in Kolkata, West Bengal. Among the leaders gathered were the sitting Chief Ministers H.D. Kumaraswamy of Karnataka, Arvind Kejriwal of Delhi, in addition to the organizer, Mamata Banerjee of West Bengal. Also in attendance were former Prime Minister H.D. Deve Gowda, former Chief Ministers Akhilesh Yadav of Uttar Pradesh, MK Stalin of Tamil Nadu, Sharad Pawar of Maharashtra, Omar Abdullah and Farooq Abdullah of Jammu and Kashmir, and Gegong Apang of Arunachal Pradesh.

AICC President Rahul Gandhi failed to attend a United India opposition rally, but sent Congress leader Mallikarjun Kharge as his emissary. Telangana Chief minister K Chandrasekhar Rao did not attend the mega rally since Indian National Congress was part of it.

See also 
Third Front
United Opposition

References

Defunct political party alliances in India
2019 Indian general election
2019 establishments in India